Moonlight is an unincorporated community in Hayes Township, Dickinson County, Kansas, United States.

History
Moonlight was named for Thomas Moonlight, Kansas Secretary of State.

Education
The community is served by Chapman USD 473 public school district.

References

Further reading

External links
 Dickinson County maps: Current, Historic, KDOT

Unincorporated communities in Dickinson County, Kansas
Unincorporated communities in Kansas